Arthrorhabdus mjobergi is a species of centipede in the Scolopendridae family. It is endemic to Australia, and was first described in 1916 by German naturalist Karl Kraepelin from material collected by Swedish zoologist and explorer Eric Mjöberg.

Distribution
The species occurs in Western Australia, the Northern Territory, South Australia and Queensland.

Behaviour
The centipedes are solitary terrestrial predators that inhabit plant litter, soil and rotting wood.

References

 

 
mjobergi
Centipedes of Australia
Endemic fauna of Australia
Fauna of the Northern Territory
Fauna of Queensland
Fauna of South Australia
Fauna of Western Australia
Animals described in 1916
Taxa named by Karl Kraepelin